The polar bear (Ursus maritimus) is a hypercarnivorous bear whose native range lies largely within the Arctic Circle, encompassing the Arctic Ocean, its surrounding seas and surrounding land masses, this includes the most northern regions of North America and Eurasia. It is the largest extant bear species, as well as the largest extant land carnivore. Although it is the sister species of the brown bear, it has evolved to occupy a narrower ecological niche, with many body characteristics adapted for cold temperatures, for moving across snow, ice and open water, and for hunting seals, which make up most of its diet. Although most polar bears are born on land, they spend most of their time on the sea ice. Their scientific name means "maritime bear" and derives from this fact. Polar bears hunt their preferred food of seals from the edge of sea ice, often living off fat reserves when no sea ice is present. Because of their dependence on the sea ice, polar bears are classified as marine mammals.

Because of expected habitat loss caused by climate change, the polar bear is classified as a vulnerable species. For decades, large-scale hunting raised international concern for the future of the species, but populations rebounded after controls and quotas began to take effect. For thousands of years, the polar bear has been a key figure in the material, spiritual, and cultural life of circumpolar peoples, and polar bears remain important in their cultures. Historically, the polar bear has also been known as the "white bear". It is sometimes referred to as the "nanook", based on the Inuit term nanuq.

Naming and etymology
Constantine John Phipps was the first to describe the polar bear as a distinct species in 1774 in his report about his 1773 expedition towards the North Pole. He chose the scientific name Ursus maritimus, the Latin for "maritime bear", due to the animal's native habitat.

The polar bear was previously considered to be in its own genus, Thalarctos. However, evidence of hybrids between polar bears and brown bears, and of the recent evolutionary divergence of the two species, does not support the establishment of this separate genus, and the accepted scientific name is now therefore Ursus maritimus, as Phipps originally proposed.

Taxonomy and evolution

The bear family, Ursidae, is thought to have split from other carnivorans about 38 million years ago. The subfamily Ursinae originated approximately 4.2 million years ago. The oldest known polar bear fossil is a 130,000 to 110,000-year-old jaw bone, found on Prince Charles Foreland in 2004. Fossils show that between 10,000 and 20,000 years ago, the polar bear's molar teeth changed significantly from those of the brown bear. Polar bears are thought to have diverged from a population of brown bears that became isolated during a period of glaciation in the Pleistocene from the eastern part of Siberia (from Kamchatka and the Kolym Peninsula).

The evidence from DNA analysis is more complex. The mitochondrial DNA (mtDNA) of the polar bear diverged from the brown bear, Ursus arctos, roughly 150,000 years ago. Further, some clades of brown bear, as assessed by their mtDNA, were thought to be more closely related to polar bears than to other brown bears, meaning that the brown bear might not be considered a species under some species concepts, but paraphyletic. The mtDNA of extinct Irish brown bears is particularly close to polar bears. A comparison of the nuclear genome of polar bears with that of brown bears revealed a different pattern, the two forming genetically distinct clades that diverged approximately 603,000 years ago, although the latest research is based on analysis of the complete genomes (rather than just the mitochondria or partial nuclear genomes) of polar and brown bears, and establishes the divergence of polar and brown bears at 400,000 years ago.

However, the two species have mated intermittently for all that time, most likely coming into contact with each other during warming periods, when polar bears were driven onto land and brown bears migrated northward. Most brown bears have about 2 percent genetic material from polar bears, but one population, the ABC Islands bears, has between 5 percent and 10 percent polar bear genes, indicating more frequent and recent mating. Polar bears can breed with brown bears to produce fertile grizzly–polar bear hybrids; rather than indicating that they have only recently diverged, the new evidence suggests more frequent mating has continued over a longer period of time, and thus the two bears remain genetically similar. However, because neither species can survive long in the other's ecological niche, and because they have different morphology, metabolism, social and feeding behaviours, and other phenotypic characteristics, the two bears are generally classified as separate species.

When the polar bear was originally documented, two subspecies were identified: the American polar bear (Ursus maritimus maritimus) by Constantine J. Phipps in 1774, and the Siberian polar bear (Ursus maritimus marinus) by Peter Simon Pallas in 1776. This distinction has since been invalidated. One alleged fossil subspecies has been identified: Ursus maritimus tyrannus, which became extinct during the Pleistocene. U.m. tyrannus was significantly larger than the living subspecies. However, recent reanalysis of the fossil suggests that it was actually a brown bear.

Population and distribution

The polar bear is found in the Arctic Circle and adjacent land masses as far south as Newfoundland. Due to the absence of human development in its remote habitat, it retains more of its original range than any other extant carnivore. While they are rare north of 88°, there is evidence that they range all the way across the Arctic, and as far south as James Bay in Canada. Their southernmost range is near the boundary between the subarctic and humid continental climate zones. They can occasionally drift widely with the sea ice, and there have been anecdotal sightings as far south as Berlevåg on the Norwegian mainland and the Kuril Islands in the Sea of Okhotsk. It is difficult to estimate a global population of polar bears as much of the range has been poorly studied; however, biologists use a working estimate of about 20–25,000 or 22–31,000 polar bears worldwide.

With the discovery of a southeast Greenland population in 2022, there are 20 generally recognized, discrete subpopulations of polar bears. The subpopulations display seasonal fidelity to particular areas, but DNA studies show that they are not reproductively isolated. The 14 North American subpopulations range from the Beaufort Sea south to Hudson Bay and east to eastern Greenland and account for about 54% of the global population.

The usual range includes the territory of five nations: Denmark (Greenland), Norway (Svalbard), Russia, the United States (Alaska) and Canada. These five nations are the signatories of the International Agreement on the Conservation of Polar Bears, which mandates cooperation on research and conservation efforts throughout the polar bear's range. Bears sometimes swim to Iceland from Greenland—about 600 sightings since the country's settlement in the 9th century, and five in the 21st century —and are always killed because of their danger, as well as the cost and difficulty of repatriation.

Modern methods of tracking polar bear populations have been implemented only since the mid-1980s, and are expensive to perform consistently over a large area. The most accurate counts require flying a helicopter in the Arctic climate to find polar bears, shooting a tranquilizer dart at the bear to sedate it, and then tagging the bear. In Nunavut, some Inuit have reported increases in bear sightings around human settlements in recent years, leading to a belief that populations are increasing. Scientists have responded by noting that hungry bears may be congregating around human settlements, leading to the illusion that populations are higher than they actually are. The Polar Bear Specialist Group of the IUCN Species Survival Commission takes the position that "estimates of subpopulation size or sustainable harvest levels should not be made solely on the basis of traditional ecological knowledge without supporting scientific studies."

Of the 19 polar bear subpopulations recognized in 2017, one was in decline, two were increasing, seven were stable, and nine had insufficient data.

Habitat

The polar bear is a marine mammal because it spends many months of the year at sea. However, it is the only living marine mammal with powerful, large limbs and feet that allow them to cover kilometres on foot and run on land. Its preferred habitat is the annual sea ice covering the waters over the continental shelf and the Arctic inter-island archipelagos. These areas, known as the "Arctic ring of life", have high biological productivity in comparison to the deep waters of the high Arctic. The polar bear tends to frequent areas where sea ice meets water, such as polynyas and leads (temporary stretches of open water in Arctic ice), to hunt the seals that make up most of its diet. Freshwater is limited in these environments because it is either locked up in snow or saline. Polar bears are able to produce water through the metabolism of fats found in seal blubber, and are therefore found primarily along the perimeter of the polar ice pack, rather than in the Polar Basin close to the North Pole where the density of seals is low.

Annual ice contains areas of water that appear and disappear throughout the year as the weather changes. Seals migrate in response to these changes, and polar bears must follow their prey. In Hudson Bay, James Bay, and some other areas, the ice melts completely each summer (an event often referred to as "ice-floe breakup"), forcing polar bears to go onto land and wait through the months until the next freeze-up. In the Chukchi and Beaufort seas, most polar bears retreat each summer to the ice further north that remains frozen year-round, though a large portion of the population (15–40%) has been observed spending all summer on land every year in these areas since the 1980s.

Physical characteristics

The only other bear of comparable size to the polar bear is the Kodiak bear, which is a subspecies of brown bear. Adult male polar bears weigh  and measure  in total length. Around the Beaufort Sea, however, mature males reportedly average . The polar bear is among the most sexually dimorphic of mammals, surpassed only by the pinnipeds such as elephant seals. The largest polar bear on record, reportedly weighing , was a male shot at Kotzebue Sound in northwestern Alaska in 1960.

Compared with its closest relative, the brown bear, the polar bear has a more elongated body build and a longer skull and nose. As predicted by Allen's rule for a northerly animal, the legs are stocky and the ears and tail are small. The pads of the paws are covered with small, soft papillae (dermal bumps), which provide traction on the ice. The polar bear's claws are short and stocky compared to those of the brown bear, perhaps to serve the former's need to grip heavy prey and ice. The claws are deeply scooped on the underside which assists in digging in the ice of the natural habitat. Research of injury patterns in polar bear forelimbs found injuries to the right forelimb to be more frequent than those to the left, suggesting, perhaps, right-handedness. Unlike the brown bear, polar bears in captivity are rarely overweight or particularly large, possibly as a reaction to the warm conditions of most zoos.

The 42 teeth of a polar bear reflect its highly carnivorous diet. The cheek teeth are smaller and more jagged than in the brown bear, and the canines are larger and sharper.

Polar bear fur consists of a layer of dense underfur and an outer layer of guard hairs, which appear white to tan but are actually transparent. Two genes that are known to influence melanin production, LYST and AIM1, are both mutated in polar bears, possibly leading to the absence on this pigment in their fur. Polar bears gradually moult from May to August, but, unlike other Arctic mammals, they do not shed their coat for a darker shade to provide camouflage in summer conditions. The hollow guard hairs of a polar bear coat were once thought to act as fiber-optic tubes to conduct light to its black skin, where it could be absorbed; however, this hypothesis was disproved by a study in 1998.

The white coat usually yellows with age. When kept in captivity in warm, humid conditions, the fur may turn a pale shade of green due to algae growing inside the guard hairs. Males have significantly longer hairs on their forelegs, which increase in length until the bear reaches 14 years of age. The male's ornamental foreleg hair is thought to attract females, serving a similar function to the lion's mane.

Its hearing is about as acute as that of a human, and its vision is also good at long distances.

The polar bear is an excellent swimmer and often will swim for days. She then travelled another . During the swim, the bear lost 22% of her body mass and her yearling cub died. With its body fat providing buoyancy, the bear swims in a dog paddle fashion using its large forepaws for propulsion.

Life history and behaviour

Unlike brown bears, polar bears are not territorial. Although stereotyped as being voraciously aggressive, they are normally cautious in confrontations, and often choose to escape rather than fight. Satiated polar bears rarely attack humans unless severely provoked. However, due to their lack of prior human interaction, hungry polar bears are extremely unpredictable, fearless towards people and are known to kill and sometimes eat humans. Many attacks by brown bears are the result of surprising the animal, which is not the case with the polar bear. Polar bears are stealth hunters, and the victim is often unaware of the bear's presence until the attack is underway. Whereas brown bears often maul a person and then leave, polar bear attacks are more likely to be predatory and are almost always fatal. However, due to the very small human population around the Arctic, such attacks are rare. Michio Hoshino, a Japanese wildlife photographer, was once pursued briefly by a hungry male polar bear in northern Alaska. According to Hoshino, the bear started running but Hoshino made it to his truck. The bear was able to reach the truck and tore one of the doors off the truck before Hoshino was able to drive off.

In general, adult polar bears live solitary lives. Yet, they have often been seen playing together for hours at a time and even sleeping in an embrace, and polar bear zoologist Nikita Ovsianikov has described adult males as having "well-developed friendships." Cubs are especially playful as well. Among young males in particular, play-fighting may be a means of practicing for serious competition during mating seasons later in life. Polar bears are usually quiet but do communicate with various sounds and vocalizations. Females communicate with their young with moans and chuffs, and the distress calls of both cubs and subadults consists of bleats. Cubs may hum while nursing. When nervous, bears produce huffs, chuffs and snorts while hisses, growls and roars are signs of aggression. Chemical communication can also be important: bears leave behind their scent in their tracks which allow individuals to keep track of one another in the vast Arctic wilderness.

In 1992, a photographer near Churchill took a now widely circulated set of photographs of a polar bear playing with a Canadian Eskimo Dog (Canis familiaris) a tenth of its size. The pair wrestled harmlessly together each afternoon for 10 days in a row for no apparent reason, although the bear may have been trying to demonstrate its friendliness in the hope of sharing the kennel's food. This kind of social interaction is uncommon; it is far more typical for polar bears to behave aggressively towards dogs.

Hunting and diet

The polar bear is the most carnivorous member of the bear family, and throughout most of its range, its diet primarily consists of ringed (Pusa hispida) and bearded seals (Erignathus barbatus). The Arctic is home to millions of seals, which become prey when they surface in holes in the ice in order to breathe, or when they haul out on the ice to rest. Polar bears hunt primarily at the interface between ice, water, and air; they only rarely catch seals on land or in open water.

The polar bear's most common hunting method is called still-hunting: the bear uses its excellent sense of smell to locate a seal breathing hole, and crouches nearby in silence for a seal to appear. The bear may lie in wait for several hours. When the seal exhales, the bear smells its breath, reaches into the hole with a forepaw, and drags it out onto the ice. The polar bear kills the seal by biting its head to crush its skull. The polar bear also hunts by stalking seals resting on the ice: upon spotting a seal, it walks to within , and then crouches. If the seal does not notice, the bear creeps to within  of the seal and then suddenly rushes forth to attack. A third hunting method is to raid the birth lairs that female seals create in the snow.

A widespread legend tells that polar bears cover their black noses with their paws when hunting. This behaviour, if it happens, is rare – although the story exists in the oral history of northern peoples and in accounts by early Arctic explorers, there is no record of an eyewitness account of the behaviour in recent decades.

Mature bears tend to eat only the calorie-rich skin and blubber of the seal, which are highly digestible, whereas younger bears consume the protein-rich red meat. Studies have also photographed polar bears scaling near-vertical cliffs, to eat birds' chicks and eggs. For subadult bears, which are independent of their mother but have not yet gained enough experience and body size to successfully hunt seals, scavenging the carcasses from other bears' kills is an important source of nutrition. Subadults may also be forced to accept a half-eaten carcass if they kill a seal but cannot defend it from larger polar bears. After feeding, polar bears wash themselves with water or snow.

Although polar bears are extraordinarily powerful, its primary prey species, the ringed seal, is much smaller than itself, and many of the seals hunted are pups rather than adults. Ringed seals are born weighing  and grown to an estimated average weight of only . They also in places prey heavily upon the harp seal (Pagophilus groenlandicus), the harbour seal (Phoca vitulina), or the hooded seal (Cystophora cristata). The bearded seal, on the other hand, can be nearly the same size as the bear itself, averaging . Large males also occasionally attempt to hunt and kill even larger prey items. It can kill an adult walrus (Odobenus rosmarus), although this is rarely attempted. A polar bear may charge a group of walruses, with the goal of separating a young, infirm, or injured walrus from the pod. They will even attack adult walruses when their diving holes have frozen over or intercept them before they can get back to the diving hole in the ice. Yet, polar bears will very seldom attack full-grown adult walruses, with the largest male walrus probably invulnerable unless otherwise injured or incapacitated. Since an attack on a walrus tends to be an extremely protracted and exhausting venture, bears have been known to back down from the attack after making the initial injury to the walrus. Polar bears have also been seen to prey on beluga whales (Delphinapterus leucas) and narwhals (Monodon monoceros), by swiping at them at breathing holes. The whales are of similar size to the walrus and nearly as difficult for the bear to subdue. Most terrestrial animals in the Arctic can outrun the polar bear on land as polar bears overheat quickly, and most marine animals the bear encounters can outswim it. In some areas, the polar bear's diet is supplemented by walrus calves and by the carcasses of dead adult walruses or whales, whose blubber is readily devoured even when rotten. Polar bears sometimes swim underwater to catch fish like the Arctic charr or the fourhorn sculpin.

With the exception of pregnant females, polar bears are active year-round, although they have a vestigial hibernation induction trigger in their blood. Unlike brown and black bears, polar bears are capable of fasting for up to several months during late summer and early fall, when they cannot hunt for seals because the sea is unfrozen. When sea ice is unavailable during summer and early autumn, some populations live off fat reserves for months at a time, as polar bears do not 'hibernate' any time of the year.

Being both curious animals and scavengers, polar bears investigate and consume garbage where they come into contact with humans. Polar bears may attempt to consume almost anything they can find, including hazardous substances such as styrofoam, plastic, car batteries, ethylene glycol, hydraulic fluid, and motor oil. The dump in Churchill, Manitoba was closed in 2006 to protect bears, and waste is now recycled or transported to Thompson, Manitoba.

Dietary flexibility
Although seal predation is the primary and an indispensable way of life for most polar bears, when alternatives are present they are quite flexible. Polar bears consume a wide variety of other wild foods, including muskox (Ovibos moschatus), reindeer (Rangifer tarandus), birds, eggs, rodents, crabs, other crustaceans, fish and other polar bears. They may also eat plants, including berries, roots, and kelp; however, none of these have been a significant part of their diet, except for beachcast marine mammal carcasses. Given the change in climate, with ice breaking up in areas such as the Hudson Bay earlier than it used to, polar bears are exploiting food resources such as snow geese and eggs, and plants such as lyme grass in increased quantities.

When stalking land animals, such as muskox, reindeer, and even willow ptarmigan (Lagopus lagopus), polar bears appear to make use of vegetative cover and wind direction to bring them as close to their prey as possible before attacking. Polar bears have been observed to hunt the small Svalbard reindeer (R. t. platyrhynchus), which weigh only  as adults, as well as the barren-ground caribou (R. t. groenlandicus), which is about twice as heavy as the former. Adult muskox, which can weigh  or more, are a more formidable quarry. Although ungulates are not typical prey, the killing of one during the summer months can greatly increase the odds of survival during that lean period. Like the brown bear, most ungulate prey of polar bears is likely to be young, sickly or injured specimens rather than healthy adults. The polar bear's metabolism is specialized to require large amounts of fat from marine mammals, and it cannot derive sufficient caloric intake from terrestrial food.

In their southern range, especially near Hudson Bay and James Bay, Canadian polar bears endure all summer without sea ice to hunt from. Here, their food ecology shows their dietary flexibility. They still manage to consume some seals, but they are food-deprived in summer as only marine mammal carcasses are an important alternative without sea ice, especially carcasses of the beluga whale. These alternatives may reduce the rate of weight loss of bears when on land. One scientist found that 71% of the Hudson Bay bears had fed on seaweed (marine algae) and that about half were feeding on birds such as the dovekie and sea ducks, especially the long-tailed duck (53%) and common eider, by swimming underwater to catch them. They were also diving to feed on blue mussels and other underwater food sources like the green sea urchin. 24% had eaten moss recently, 19% had consumed grass, 34% had eaten black crowberry and about half had consumed willows. This study illustrates the polar bear's dietary flexibility but it does not represent its life history elsewhere. Most polar bears elsewhere will never have access to these alternatives, except for the marine mammal carcasses that are important wherever they occur.

In Svalbard, polar bears were observed to kill white-beaked dolphins during spring, when the dolphins were trapped in the sea ice. The bears then proceeded to cache the carcasses, which remained and were eaten during the ice-free summer and autumn.

Reproduction and lifecycle

Courtship and mating take place on the sea ice in April and May, when polar bears congregate in the best seal hunting areas. Polar bears have a generally polygynous mating system; recent genetic testing of mothers and cubs, however, has uncovered cases of litters in which cubs have different fathers. Partners stay together and mate repeatedly for an entire week; the mating ritual induces ovulation in the female.

After mating, the fertilized egg remains in a suspended state until August or September. During these four months, the pregnant female eats prodigious amounts of food, gaining at least  and often more than doubling her body weight.

Maternity denning and early life

When the ice floes are at their minimum in the fall, ending the possibility of hunting, each pregnant female digs a maternity den consisting of a narrow entrance tunnel leading to one to three chambers. Most maternity dens are in snowdrifts, but may also be made underground in permafrost if it is not sufficiently cold yet for snow. In most subpopulations, maternity dens are situated on land a few kilometres from the coast, and the individuals in a subpopulation tend to reuse the same denning areas each year. The polar bears that do not den on land make their dens on the sea ice. In the den, she enters a dormant state similar to hibernation. This hibernation-like state does not consist of continuous sleeping; however, the bear's heart rate slows from 46 to 27 beats per minute. Her body temperature does not decrease during this period as it would for a typical mammal in hibernation.

The earliest recorded birth of polar bears in captivity was on 11 October 2011 in the Toronto Zoo. On average, each litter has two cubs. The family remains in the den until mid-February to mid-April, with the mother maintaining her fast while nursing her cubs on a fat-rich milk. For about 12 to 15 days, the family spends time outside the den while remaining in its vicinity, the mother grazing on vegetation while the cubs become used to walking and playing. Then they begin the long walk from the denning area to the sea ice, where the mother can once again catch seals. Depending on the timing of ice-floe breakup in the fall, she may have fasted for up to eight months. During this time, cubs playfully imitate the mother's hunting methods in preparation for later life.

Female polar bears have been known to adopt other cubs. Multiple cases of adoption of wild cubs have been confirmed by genetic testing. Adult bears of either sex occasionally kill and eat polar bear cubs. As of 2006, in Alaska, 42% of cubs were reaching 12 months of age, down from 65% in 1991. In most areas, cubs are weaned at two and a half years of age, when the mother chases them away or abandons them. The Western Hudson Bay subpopulation is unusual in that its female polar bears sometimes wean their cubs at only one and a half years. This was the case for 40% of cubs there in the early 1980s; however by the 1990s, fewer than 20% of cubs were weaned this young. After the mother leaves, sibling cubs sometimes travel and share food together for weeks or months.

Later life
Females begin to breed at the age of four years in most areas, and five years in the area of the Beaufort Sea. Males usually reach sexual maturity at six years; however, as competition for females is fierce, many do not breed until the age of eight or ten. A study in Hudson Bay indicated that both the reproductive success and the maternal weight of females peaked in their mid-teens. Maternal success appeared to decline after this point, possibly because of an age-related impairment in the ability to store the fat necessary to rear cubs.

Polar bears appear to be less affected by infectious diseases and parasites than most terrestrial mammals. Polar bears are especially susceptible to Trichinella, a parasitic roundworm they contract through cannibalism, although infections are usually not fatal. Only one case of a polar bear with rabies has been documented, even though polar bears frequently interact with Arctic foxes, which often carry rabies. Bacterial leptospirosis and Morbillivirus have been recorded. Polar bears sometimes have problems with various skin diseases that may be caused by mites or other parasites.

Life expectancy
Polar bears rarely live beyond 25 years. The oldest wild bears on record died at age 32, whereas the oldest captive was a female who died in 1991, age 43. The causes of death in wild adult polar bears are poorly understood, as carcasses are rarely found in the species's frigid habitat. In the wild, old polar bears eventually become too weak to catch food, and gradually starve to death. Polar bears injured in fights or accidents may either die from their injuries, or become unable to hunt effectively, leading to starvation.

Ecological role
The polar bear is the apex predator within its range, and is a keystone species for the Arctic. Several animal species, particularly Arctic foxes (Vulpes lagopus) and glaucous gulls (Larus hyperboreus), routinely scavenge polar bear kills.

The relationship between ringed seals and polar bears is so close that the abundance of ringed seals in some areas appears to regulate the density of polar bears, while polar bear predation in turn regulates density and reproductive success of ringed seals. The evolutionary pressure of polar bear predation on seals probably accounts for some significant differences between Arctic and Antarctic seals. Compared to the Antarctic, where there is no major surface predator, Arctic seals use more breathing holes per individual, appear more restless when hauled out on the ice, and rarely defecate on the ice. The baby fur of most Arctic seal species is white, presumably to provide camouflage from predators, whereas Antarctic seals all have dark fur at birth.

Brown bears tend to dominate polar bears in disputes over carcasses, and dead polar bear cubs have been found in brown bear dens. Wolves are rarely encountered by polar bears, though there are two records of Arctic wolf (Canis lupus arctos) packs killing polar bear cubs. Adult polar bears are occasionally vulnerable to predation by orcas (Orcinus orca) while swimming, but they are rarely reported as taken and bears are likely to avoid entering the water if possible if they detect an orca pod in the area. The melting sea ice in the Arctic may be causing an increase of orcas in the Arctic sea, which may increase the risk of predation on polar bears but also may benefit the bears by providing more whale carcasses that they can scavenge. The remains of polar bears have been found in the stomachs of large Greenland sharks (Somniosus microcephalus), although it certainly cannot be ruled out that the bears were merely scavenged by this slow-moving, unusual shark. A rather unlikely killer of a grown polar bear has reportedly included a wolverine (Gulo gulo), anecdotally reported to have suffocated a bear in a zoo with a bite to the throat during a conflict. This report may well be dubious, however. Polar bears are sometimes the host of arctic mites such as Alaskozetes antarcticus.

Long-distance swimming and diving
Researchers tracked 52 sows in the southern Beaufort Sea off Alaska with GPS system collars; no boars were involved in the study due to males' necks being too thick for the GPS-equipped collars. The length of these swims ranged from most of a day to ten days. Ten of the sows had a cub swim with them and after a year, six cubs survived. The study did not determine if the others lost their cubs before, during, or some time after their long swims. Researchers do not know whether or not this is a new behaviour; before polar ice shrinkage, they opined that there was probably neither the need nor opportunity to swim such long distances. As noted above, there have been 600 recorded instances of polar bears in Iceland since the 9th century.

The polar bear may swim underwater for up to three minutes to approach seals on shore or on ice floes.

Hunting

Indigenous people

Polar bears have long provided important raw materials for Arctic peoples, including the Inuit, Yupik, Chukchi, Nenets, Russian Pomors and others. Hunters commonly used teams of dogs to distract the bear, allowing the hunter to spear the bear or shoot it with arrows at closer range. Almost all parts of captured animals had a use. The fur was used in particular to make trousers and, by the Nenets, to make galoshes-like outer footwear called ; the meat is edible, despite some risk of trichinosis; the fat was used in food and as a fuel for lighting homes, alongside seal and whale blubber; sinews were used as thread for sewing clothes; the gallbladder and sometimes heart were dried and powdered for medicinal purposes; the large canine teeth were highly valued as talismans. Only the liver was not used, as its high concentration of vitamin A is poisonous. As a carnivore, which feeds largely upon fish-eating carnivores, the polar bear ingests large amounts of vitamin A that is stored in their livers. The resulting high concentrations cause hypervitaminosis A, Hunters make sure to either toss the liver into the sea or bury it to prevent their dogs from being poisoned. Traditional subsistence hunting was on a small enough scale to not significantly affect polar bear populations, mostly because of the sparseness of the human population in polar bear habitat.

History of commercial harvest
In Russia, polar bear furs were already being commercially traded in the 14th century, though it was of low value compared to Arctic fox or even reindeer fur. The growth of the human population in the Eurasian Arctic in the 16th and 17th century, together with the advent of firearms and increasing trade, dramatically increased the harvest of polar bears. However, since polar bear fur has always played a marginal commercial role, data on the historical harvest is fragmentary. It is known, for example, that already in the winter of 1784/1785 Russian Pomors on Spitsbergen harvested 150 polar bears in Magdalenefjorden. In the early 20th century, Norwegian hunters were harvesting 300 bears per year at the same location. Estimates of total historical harvest suggest that from the beginning of the 18th century, roughly 400 to 500 animals were being harvested annually in northern Eurasia, reaching a peak of 1,300 to 1,500 animals in the early 20th century, and falling off as the numbers began dwindling.

In the first half of the 20th century, mechanized and overpoweringly efficient methods of hunting and trapping came into use in North America as well. Polar bears were chased from snowmobiles, icebreakers, and airplanes, the latter practice described in a 1965 New York Times editorial as being "about as sporting as machine gunning a cow." Norwegians used "self-killing guns", comprising a loaded rifle in a baited box that was placed at the level of a bear's head, and which fired when the string attached to the bait was pulled. The numbers taken grew rapidly in the 1960s, peaking around 1968 with a global total of 1,250 bears that year.

Contemporary regulations

Concerns over the future survival of the species led to the development of national regulations on polar bear hunting, beginning in the mid-1950s. The Soviet Union banned all hunting in 1956. Canada began imposing hunting quotas in 1968. Norway passed a series of increasingly strict regulations from 1965 to 1973, and has completely banned hunting since then. The United States began regulating hunting in 1971 and adopted the Marine Mammal Protection Act in 1972. In 1973, the International Agreement on the Conservation of Polar Bears was signed by all five nations whose territory is inhabited by polar bears: Canada, Denmark, Norway, the Soviet Union, and the United States. Member countries agreed to place restrictions on recreational and commercial hunting, ban hunting from aircraft and icebreakers, and conduct further research. The treaty allows hunting "by local people using traditional methods". Norway is the only country of the five in which all harvest of polar bears is banned. The agreement was a rare case of international cooperation during the Cold War. Biologist Ian Stirling commented, "For many years, the conservation of polar bears was the only subject in the entire Arctic that nations from both sides of the Iron Curtain could agree upon sufficiently to sign an agreement. Such was the intensity of human fascination with this magnificent predator, the only marine bear."

Agreements have been made between countries to co-manage their shared polar bear subpopulations. After several years of negotiations, Russia and the United States signed an agreement in October 2000 to jointly set quotas for indigenous subsistence hunting in Alaska and Chukotka. The treaty was ratified in October 2007. In September 2015, the polar bear range states agreed upon a "circumpolar action plan" describing their conservation strategy for polar bears.

The species is listed in Appendix II of the Convention on International Trade in Endangered Species (CITES) meaning international trade, including in parts or derivatives, is controlled by the CITES system of permits and certificates. The United States government has proposed that polar bears be transferred to Appendix I of CITES which would ban all commercial international trade in polar bear parts. The decision to leave the species listed under Appendix II was endorsed by the IUCN and TRAFFIC, who determined that such an uplisting was unlikely to confer a conservation benefit.

Canada

Polar bears were designated "Not at Risk" in April 1986 and uplisted to "Special Concern" in April 1991. This status was re-evaluated and confirmed in April 1999, November 2002, and April 2008. Polar bears continue to be listed as a species of special concern in Canada because of their sensitivity to overharvest and because of an expected range contraction caused by loss of Arctic sea ice.

More than 600 bears are killed per year by humans across Canada, a rate calculated by scientists to be unsustainable for some areas, notably Baffin Bay. Canada has allowed sport hunters accompanied by local guides and dog-sled teams since 1970, but the practice was not common until the 1980s. The guiding of sport hunters provides meaningful employment and an important source of income for northern communities in which economic opportunities are few. Sport hunting can bring CDN$20,000 to $35,000 per bear into northern communities, which until recently has been mostly from American hunters.

The territory of Nunavut accounts for the location 80% of annual kills in Canada. In 2005, the government of Nunavut increased the quota from 400 to 518 bears, despite protests from the IUCN Polar Bear Specialist Group. In two areas where harvest levels have been increased based on increased sightings, science-based studies have indicated declining populations, and a third area is considered data-deficient. While most of that quota is hunted by the indigenous Inuit, a growing share is sold to recreational hunters. (0.8% in the 1970s, 7.1% in the 1980s, and 14.6% in the 1990s) Nunavut polar bear biologist, Mitchell Taylor, who was formerly responsible for polar bear conservation in the territory, has insisted that bear numbers are being sustained under current hunting limits. In 2010, the 2005 increase was partially reversed. Government of Nunavut officials announced that the polar bear quota for the Baffin Bay region would be gradually reduced from 105 per year to 65 by 2013. The Government of the Northwest Territories maintain their own quota of 72 to 103 bears within the Inuvialuit communities of which some are set aside for sports hunters. Environment Canada also banned the export from Canada of fur, claws, skulls and other products from polar bears harvested in Baffin Bay as of 1 January 2010.

Because of the way polar bear hunting quotas are managed in Canada, attempts to discourage sport hunting would actually increase the number of bears killed in the short term. Canada allocates a certain number of permits each year to sport and subsistence hunting, and those that are not used for sport hunting are re-allocated to indigenous subsistence hunting. Whereas northern communities kill all the polar bears they are permitted to take each year, only half of sport hunters with permits actually manage to kill a polar bear. If a sport hunter does not kill a polar bear before his or her permit expires, the permit cannot be transferred to another hunter.

In August 2011, Environment Canada published a national polar bear conservation strategy.

Greenland
In Greenland, hunting restrictions were first introduced in 1994 and expanded by executive order in 2005. Until 2005 Greenland placed no limit on hunting by indigenous people. However, in 2006 it imposed a limit of 150, while also allowed recreational hunting for the first time. Other provisions included year-round protection of cubs and mothers, restrictions on weapons used and various administrative requirements to catalogue kills.

Norway
Polar bears were hunted heavily in Svalbard, Norway throughout the 19th century and to as recently as 1973, when the conservation treaty was signed. 900 bears a year were harvested in the 1920s and after World War II, there were as many as 400–500 harvested annually. Some regulations of hunting did exist. In 1927, poisoning was outlawed while in 1939, certain denning sights were declared off limits. The killing of females and cubs was made illegal in 1965. Killing of polar bears decreased somewhat 25–30 years before the treaty. Despite this, the polar bear population continued to decline and by 1973, only around 1000 bears were left in Svalbard. Only with the passage of the treaty did they begin to recover.

Russia
The Soviet Union banned the harvest of polar bears in 1956; however, poaching continued, and is estimated to pose a serious threat to the polar bear population. In recent years, polar bears have approached coastal villages in Chukotka more frequently due to the shrinking of the sea ice, endangering humans and raising concerns that illegal hunting would become even more prevalent. In 2007, the Russian government made subsistence hunting legal for indigenous Chukotkan peoples only, a move supported by Russia's most prominent bear researchers and the World Wide Fund for Nature as a means to curb poaching.

Polar bears are currently listed as "Rare", of "Uncertain Status", or "Rehabilitated and rehabilitating" in the Red Data Book of Russia, depending on population. In 2010, the Ministry of Natural Resources and Environment published a strategy for polar bear conservation in Russia.

United States
The Marine Mammal Protection Act of 1972 afforded polar bears some protection in the United States. It banned hunting (except by indigenous subsistence hunters), banned importing of polar bear parts (except polar bear pelts taken legally in Canada), and banned the harassment of polar bears. On 15 May 2008, the United States Department of the Interior listed the polar bear as a threatened species under the Endangered Species Act, citing the melting of Arctic sea ice as the primary threat to the polar bear. It banned all importing of polar bear trophies. Importing products made from polar bears had been prohibited from 1972 to 1994 under the Marine Mammal Protection Act, and restricted between 1994 and 2008. Under those restrictions, permits from the United States Fish and Wildlife Service were required to import sport-hunted polar bear trophies taken in hunting expeditions in Canada. The permit process required that the bear be taken from an area with quotas based on sound management principles. Since 1994, hundreds of sport-hunted polar bear trophies have been imported into the U.S. In 2015, the U.S. Fish and Wildlife Service published a draft conservation management plan for polar bears to improve their status under the Endangered Species Act and the Marine Mammal Protection Act.

Conservation status, threats, and controversies

Polar bear population sizes and trends are difficult to estimate accurately because they occupy remote home ranges and exist at low population densities. Polar bear fieldwork can also be hazardous to researchers. As of 2015, the International Union for Conservation of Nature (IUCN) reports that the global population of polar bears is 22,000 to 31,000, and the current population trend is unknown. Nevertheless, polar bears are listed as "Vulnerable" under criterion A3c, which indicates an expected population decrease of ≥30% over the next three generations (~34.5 years) due to "decline in area of occupancy, extent of occurrence and/or quality of habitat". Risks to the polar bear include climate change, pollution in the form of toxic contaminants, conflicts with shipping, oil and gas exploration and development, and human-bear interactions including harvesting and possible stresses from recreational polar-bear watching.

According to the World Wildlife Fund, the polar bear is important as an indicator of Arctic ecosystem health. Polar bears are studied to gain understanding of what is happening throughout the Arctic, because at-risk polar bears are often a sign of something wrong with the Arctic marine ecosystem.

Climate change

The key danger for polar bears posed by the effects of climate change is malnutrition or starvation due to habitat loss. Polar bears hunt seals from a platform of sea ice. Rising temperatures cause the sea ice to melt earlier in the year, driving the bears to shore before they have built sufficient fat reserves to survive the period of scarce food in the late summer and early fall. Reduction in sea-ice cover also forces bears to swim longer distances, which further depletes their energy stores and occasionally leads to drowning. Thinner sea ice tends to deform more easily, which appears to make it more difficult for polar bears to access seals. Insufficient nourishment leads to lower reproductive rates in adult females and lower survival rates in cubs and juvenile bears, in addition to poorer body condition in bears of all ages.

The International Union for Conservation of Nature, Arctic Climate Impact Assessment, United States Geological Survey and many leading polar bear biologists have expressed grave concerns about the impact of climate change, with some predicting extinction by 2100.

In addition to creating nutritional stress, a warming climate is expected to affect various other aspects of polar bear life: changes in sea ice affect the ability of pregnant females to build suitable maternity dens. As the distance increases between the pack ice and the coast, females must swim longer distances to reach favoured denning areas on land. Thawing of permafrost would affect the bears who traditionally den underground, and warm winters could result in den roofs collapsing or having reduced insulative value. For the polar bears that currently den on multi-year ice, increased ice mobility may result in longer distances for mothers and young cubs to walk when they return to seal-hunting areas in the spring. Disease-causing bacteria and parasites would flourish more readily in a warmer climate.

Problematic interactions between polar bears and humans, such as foraging by bears in garbage dumps, have historically been more prevalent in years when ice-floe breakup occurred early and local polar bears were relatively thin. Increased human-bear interactions, including fatal attacks on humans, are likely to increase as the sea ice shrinks and hungry bears try to find food on land.

The effects of climate change are most profound in the southern part of the polar bear's range, and this is indeed where significant degradation of local populations has been observed. The Western Hudson Bay subpopulation, in a southern part of the range, also happens to be one of the best-studied polar bear subpopulations. This subpopulation feeds heavily on ringed seals in late spring, when newly weaned and easily hunted seal pups are abundant. The late spring hunting season ends for polar bears when the ice begins to melt and break up, and they fast or eat little during the summer until the sea freezes again.

Due to warming air temperatures, ice-floe breakup in western Hudson Bay is currently occurring three weeks earlier than it did 30 years ago, reducing the duration of the polar bear feeding season. Between 1987 and 2004, the Western Hudson Bay population declined by 22%, although the population was listed as "stable" as of 2017. As the climate change melts sea ice, the U.S. Geological Survey projects that two-thirds of polar bears will disappear by 2050.

In Alaska, the effects of sea ice shrinkage have contributed to higher mortality rates in polar bear cubs, and have led to changes in the denning locations of pregnant females. The proportion of maternity dens on sea ice has changed from 62% between the years 1985 through 1994, to 37% over the years 1998 through 2004. Thus, now the Alaskan population more resembles the world population in that it is more likely to den on land. In recent years, polar bears in the Arctic have undertaken longer than usual swims to find prey, possibly resulting in four recorded drownings in the unusually large ice pack regression of 2005.

A new development is that polar bears have begun ranging to new territory. While not unheard of but still uncommon, polar bears have been sighted increasingly in larger numbers ashore, staying on the mainland for longer periods of time during the summer months, particularly in North Canada, traveling farther inland. This may cause an increased reliance on terrestrial diets, such as goose eggs, waterfowl and caribou, as well as increased human–bear conflict.

Pollution
Polar bears accumulate high levels of persistent organic pollutants such as polychlorinated biphenyl (PCBs) and chlorinated pesticides. Due to their position at the top of the ecological pyramid, with a diet heavy in blubber in which halocarbons concentrate, their bodies are among the most contaminated of Arctic mammals. Halocarbons (also known as organohalogens) are known to be toxic to other animals, because they mimic hormone chemistry, and biomarkers such as immunoglobulin G and retinol suggest similar effects on polar bears. PCBs have received the most study, and they have been associated with birth defects and immune system deficiency.

Many chemicals, such as PCBs and DDT, have been internationally banned due to the recognition of their harm on the environment. Their concentrations in polar bear tissues continued to rise for decades after being banned, as these chemicals spread through the food chain. Since then, the trend seems to have abated, with tissue concentrations of PCBs declining between studies performed from 1989 to 1993 and studies performed from 1996 to 2002. During the same time periods, DDT was found to be notably lower in the Western Hudson Bay population only.

Oil and gas development
Oil and gas development in polar bear habitat can affect the bears in a variety of ways. An oil spill in the Arctic would most likely concentrate in the areas where polar bears and their prey are also concentrated, such as sea ice leads. Because polar bears rely partly on their fur for insulation and soiling of the fur by oil reduces its insulative value, oil spills put bears at risk of dying from hypothermia. Polar bears exposed to oil spill conditions have been observed to lick the oil from their fur, leading to fatal kidney failure. Maternity dens, used by pregnant females and by females with infants, can also be disturbed by nearby oil exploration and development. Disturbance of these sensitive sites may trigger the mother to abandon her den prematurely, or abandon her litter altogether.

Predictions
Steven Amstrup and other U.S. Geological Survey scientists have predicted two-thirds of the world's polar bears may disappear by 2050, based on moderate projections for the shrinking of summer sea ice caused by climate change, though the validity of this study has been debated. The bears could disappear from Europe, Asia, and Alaska, and be depleted from the Canadian Arctic Archipelago and areas off the northern Greenland coast. By 2080, they could disappear from Greenland entirely and from the northern Canadian coast, leaving only dwindling numbers in the interior Arctic Archipelago. However, in the short term, some polar bear populations in historically colder regions of the Arctic may temporarily benefit from a milder climate, as multiyear ice that is too thick for seals to create breathing holes is replaced by thinner annual ice.

Polar bears diverged from brown bears 400,000–600,000 years ago and have survived past periods of climate fluctuation. It has been claimed that polar bears will be able to adapt to terrestrial food sources as the sea ice they use to hunt seals disappears. However, most polar bear biologists think that polar bears will be unable to completely offset the loss of calorie-rich seal blubber with terrestrial foods, and that they will be outcompeted by brown bears in this terrestrial niche, ultimately leading to a population decline.

Controversy over species protection

Warnings about the future of the polar bear are often contrasted with the fact that worldwide population estimates have increased over the past 50 years and are relatively stable today. Some estimates of the global population are around 5,000 to 10,000 in the early 1970s; other estimates were 20,000 to 40,000 during the 1980s. Current estimates put the global population at between 20,000 and 25,000 or 22,000 and 31,000. Despite the encouraging rebound of some populations, there is little evidence to suggest polar bears are thriving overall.

There are several reasons for the apparent discordance between past and projected population trends: estimates from the 1950s and 1960s were based on stories from explorers and hunters rather than on scientific surveys. Second, controls of harvesting were introduced that allowed this previously overhunted species to recover. Third, the recent effects of climate change have affected sea ice abundance in different areas to varying degrees.

Debate over the listing of the polar bear under endangered species legislation has put conservation groups and Canada's Inuit at opposing positions; the Nunavut government and many northern residents have condemned the U.S. initiative to list the polar bear under the Endangered Species Act. Many Inuit believe the polar bear population is increasing, and restrictions on commercial sport-hunting are likely to lead to a loss of income to their communities.

In culture

Indigenous folklore
For the indigenous peoples of the Arctic, polar bears have long played an important cultural and material role. Polar bear remains have been found at hunting sites dating to 2,500 to 3,000 years ago and 1,500-year-old cave paintings of polar bears have been found in the Chukchi Peninsula. Indeed, it has been suggested that Arctic peoples' skills in seal hunting and igloo construction has been in part acquired from the polar bears themselves.

The Inuit and Alaska Natives have many folk tales featuring the bears including legends in which bears are humans when inside their own houses and put on bear hides when going outside, and stories of how the constellation that is said to resemble a great bear surrounded by dogs came into being. These legends reveal a deep respect for the polar bear, which is portrayed as both spiritually powerful and closely akin to humans. The human-like posture of bears when standing and sitting, and the resemblance of a skinned bear carcass to the human body, have probably contributed to the belief that the spirits of humans and bears were interchangeable.

Among the Chukchi and Yupik of eastern Siberia, there was a longstanding shamanistic ritual of "thanksgiving" to the hunted polar bear. After killing the animal, its head and skin were removed and cleaned and brought into the home, and a feast was held in the hunting camp in its honor. To appease the spirit of the bear, traditional song and drum music was played, and the skull was ceremonially fed and offered a pipe. Only once the spirit was appeased was the skull be separated from the skin, taken beyond the bounds of the homestead, and placed in the ground, facing north.

The Nenets of north-central Siberia placed particular value on the talismanic power of the prominent canine teeth. These were traded in the villages of the lower Yenisei and Khatanga rivers to the forest-dwelling peoples further south, who would sew them into their hats as protection against brown bears. It was believed that the "little nephew" (the brown bear) would not dare to attack a man wearing the tooth of its powerful "big uncle", the polar bear. The skulls of killed polar bears were buried at sacred sites, and altars, called sedyangi, were constructed out of the skulls. Several such sites have been preserved on the Yamal Peninsula.

Symbols and mascots

Their distinctive appearance and their association with the Arctic have made polar bears popular icons, especially in those areas where they are native. The Canadian two-dollar coin carries an image of a lone polar bear on its reverse side, while a special millennium edition featured three. Vehicle licence plates in the Northwest Territories in Canada are in the shape of a polar bear, as was the case in Nunavut until 2012; these now display polar bear artwork instead. The polar bear is the mascot of Bowdoin College, Maine; the University of Alaska Fairbanks; and the 1988 Winter Olympics held in Calgary. The Eisbären Berlin hockey team uses a roaring polar bear as their logo, and the Charlotte, North Carolina hockey team the Charlotte Checkers uses a polar bear named Chubby Checker as their mascot.

Coca-Cola has used images of the polar bear in its advertising, and Polar Beverages, Nelvana, Bundaberg Rum, Klondike bars, and Fox's Glacier Mints all feature polar bears in their logos.

Fiction
Polar bears are popular in fiction, particularly in books for children or teenagers. 
The Polar Bear Son is adapted from a traditional Inuit tale. 
The animated television series Noah's Island features a polar bear named Noah as the protagonist. 
Polar bears feature prominently in East (North Child in the UK) by Edith Pattou.
The Bear by Raymond Briggs (adapted into an animated short in 1998) is a story of a girl's encounter with a polar bear.
The panserbjørne of Philip Pullman's fantasy trilogy His Dark Materials are sapient, dignified, anthropomorphic polar bears. They feature prominently in the 2007 film adaptation of The Golden Compass. 
The television series Lost features polar bears living on the tropical island setting. 
The manga and anime series Shirokuma Cafe centers on a polar bear who runs a cafe in Japan.

See also
 Charismatic megafauna
 Flagship species
 International Polar Bear Day
 2019 mass invasion of Russian polar bears
 Umbrella species

References

Bibliography

Further reading
 .

External links
 National Wildlife Federation's Polar Bear Page
 ARKive — images and movies of the polar bear (Ursus maritimus)
 Map of polar bear ranges and denning areas in Nunavut from Nunavut Planning Commission
 BBC Nature: Polar bear news, and video clips from BBC programmes past and present. 
 Photos, facts, videos from Polar Bears International that funds population, preservation, and DNA studies of the polar bear
 Map: Here's where the polar bears are vanishing
 

 
Apex predators
Pleistocene bears
Articles containing video clips
Carnivorans of Europe
Carnivorans of North America
Carnivorans of Asia
Holarctic fauna
Mammals of the Arctic
Marine mammals
Mammals described in 1774
Vulnerable animals
Vulnerable biota of Europe
Vulnerable biota of Asia
ESA threatened species
Taxa named by Constantine Phipps, 2nd Baron Mulgrave
Species endangered by climate change